Gowhar (also Romanized as Guhar; also known as Kokhar) is a village in Chavarzaq Rural District, Chavarzaq District, Tarom County, Zanjan Province, Iran. At the 2006 census, its population was 741, in 205 families.

References 

Populated places in Tarom County